Auburn may refer to:

Places

Australia
 Auburn, New South Wales

 City of Auburn, the local government area

Electoral district of Auburn
Auburn, Queensland, a locality in the Western Downs Region
Auburn, South Australia
Auburn, Tasmania
Auburn, Victoria

United States
 Auburn, Alabama
 Auburn, California
 Auburn, Colorado
 Auburn, Georgia
 Auburn, Illinois
 Auburn, Indiana
 Auburn, Iowa
 Auburn, Kansas
 Auburn, Kentucky
 Auburn, Maine
 Auburn House (Towson, Maryland), a historic home located on the grounds of Towson University
 Auburn, Massachusetts
 Auburn, Michigan
 Auburn, Mississippi
 Auburn (Natchez, Mississippi), a mansion in Duncan Park and a U.S. National Historic Landmark
 Auburn, Missouri
 Auburn, Nebraska
 Auburn, New Hampshire
 Auburn, New Jersey
 Auburn, New York
 Auburn, North Carolina
 Auburn, North Dakota
 Auburn, Oregon
 Auburn, Pennsylvania
 Auburn, Rhode Island
 Auburn, Texas
 Auburn (Bowling Green, Virginia), listed on the National Register
 Auburn (Brandy Station, Virginia), listed on the National Register
 Auburn, Washington
 Auburn, West Virginia
 Auburn, Chippewa County, Wisconsin
 Auburn, Fond du Lac County, Wisconsin
 Auburn, Wyoming

Elsewhere
 Auburn, County Westmeath, a townland in Kilkenny West civil parish, County Westmeath, Ireland
 Auburn, East Riding of Yorkshire, England
 Auburn, Nova Scotia
 Auburn, Ontario

Military
 First Battle of Auburn, fought on October 13, 1863, between Union infantry and Confederate cavalry
 Second Battle of Auburn, fought on October 14, 1863, in Fauquier County, Virginia
 USS Auburn, two ships of the United States Navy

Organizations
 Auburn Automobile, a brand name of American automobiles made in Auburn, Indiana
 Auburn Correctional Facility, a state prison in Auburn, New York
 Auburn Rubber Company, former rubber product manufacturer, especially toy vehicles
 Auburn University, a university in Auburn, Alabama
 Auburn Tigers, the athletic program of Auburn University

People
 Auburn (singer) (born 1990), American urban pop artist
 Alex Auburn, lead guitarist of Canadian death metal band Cryptopsy
 David Auburn (born 1969), American playwright
 Auburn Calloway, the criminal FedEx employee onboard Federal Express Flight 705.

Other uses
 Auburn hair, a reddish-brown hair color
 Auburn system, a penal method
 Auburn turkey, a breed of domestic turkey

See also
 Auburn Historic District (disambiguation)
 Auburn metropolitan area (disambiguation)
 Auburn School (disambiguation)
 Auburn Township (disambiguation)
 Auburndale (disambiguation)
 Mount Auburn (disambiguation)